Auburn River National Park is a protected area in the North Burnett Region, Queensland, Australia. It is in the north-east of the locality of Hawkwood extending into southern Dykehead.

Geography 
The park is 277 km northwest of Brisbane. The park is located on the Auburn River, a tributary of the Burnett River, south-west of Mundubbera.

Auburn River National Park was established in 1964 and features a steep river gorge and hardwood forests.  It contains some relics from a brief, unsuccessful goldrush in the late 19th century. Many species of birds, reptiles and mammals, such as the vulnerable brush-tailed rock-wallaby, live in habitats along the riverbank.

Camping is allowed on the northern banks of the river at a campground where some facilities are provided.  Bush camping is also permitted.

Access is via Mundubbera-Durong Road.

Walking Tracks

Walks from Auburn River Camping Area

Gorge Lookout Walk (Class 3)

Distance: 600m return

Time: Allow 15 minutes

Riverbed and Rockpools Trail (Class 4)

Distance: 1.5 km return

Time: Allow 1 hour

Gorge-top Walk (Class 3)

Distance: 3.2 km

Time: Allow 1.5 hours

See also

 Protected areas of Queensland
 Auburn River Dam

References

External links
 Auburn River National Park

National parks of Queensland
Protected areas established in 1964
1964 establishments in Australia
Wide Bay–Burnett